The Gendarmes d'élite de la Garde impériale (English: "élite gendarmes of the Imperial Guard") was a gendarmerie unit formed in 1801 by Napoleon as part of the Consular Guard which became the Imperial Guard in 1804. In time of peace, their role was to protect official residences and palaces and to provide security to important political figures. In time of war, their role was to protect the Imperial headquarters, to escort prisoners and occasionally to enforce the law and limit civil disorder in conquered cities. The unit was renamed Gendarmes des chasses du roi during the First Bourbon Restoration but was disbanded in 1815 during the Second Restoration.

Organisation

A squadron of Gendarmes d'élite was raised in 1801 and integrated into the Consular Guard. In 1804, the unit comprised two cavalry squadrons and two companies of infantry which were now part of the Imperial Guard. At full strength they were 632 men, but the infantry companies were disbanded in 1806 and only 456 cavalrymen remained in the unit.

A platoon of the Gendarmes d'élite was in charge of the execution of the Duke of Enghien in 1804. The same year a detachment of the Gendarmes d'élite escorted Napoleon in the street of Paris for his coronation.

Campaigns

The Gendarmes d'élite were nicknamed "The Immortals" because, as a military police, they were less engaged in combat than other units and had fewer personnel killed in action. However, when committed into combat they fought bravely and earned several battle honours.

Peninsular War

About 105 Gendarmes d'élite took part in the repression of the revolt of Madrid in 1808. A detachment of 56 gendarmes were part of Lassalle's great charge against Spanish positions at Medina de Rioseco (1808). They fought also at the siege of Astorga and the siege of Ciudad Rodrigo (1810).

Invasion of Russia and Sixth Coalition

The Gendarmes d'élite fought at the battle of Borodino and covered the French retreat at the battle of Berezina (1812). Despite the losses endured during the Russian campaign, the gendarmes fought at the battle of Leipzig in 1813. In a notable episode, general Fournier-Sarlovèze was sent to the Mayence prison by Napoleon for his defeatist attitude, following defeat at Leipzig. En route to Mayence, his carriage was escorted by a detachment of Gendarmes and was attacked by a group of Russian Cossacks. A gendarme was killed, but the general grabbed the sword of the dead, took the reins of the carriage and with the help of the remaining gendarmes routed the Cossacks. He then returned to his seat and stated "Go on! To Mayence!".

The gendarmes fought the Russians again at Montmirail and Vauchamps during the invasion of France (1814).

Hundred Days

The first Bourbon Restoration saw the replacement of their bearskin caps by crested helmets which was partially completed when the war of the Seventh coalition broke out. The unit last saw action at the battles of Ligny and Waterloo (1815), before being disbanded during the second Bourbon Restoration.

Uniform 
The Gendarmes d'élite wore a blue coat with red lapels, cuffs and turnbacks. The collar and cuff flaps were blue piped red. They wore buff breeches, waistcoat and gloves. They had white aiguillettes and clover-shaped epaulettes. They wore a tall bearskin cap with a visor, topped by a red round cloth patch nicknamed cul-de-singe ("monkey bottom") with a white grenade embroidered on it. They rode black horses. Belting was buff with white edges.

The trumpeter wore the same uniform but with reversed colours. They rode grey horses.

In 1815, crested helmets with black manes (red for trumpeters) were introduced but not completed, so the Gendarmes d'élite fought their last campaign with mixed headgears.

See also 

Uniform of the Gendarme d'élite, in 1815, on "Les uniformes pendant la campagne des Cent Jours"

References

Regiments of Napoleon I's Imperial Guard
Cavalry regiments of France
Military units and formations established in 1801
Military units and formations disestablished in 1815